Andrey Nikolaevich Derevyankin (10 July 1959) is a politician, Soviet dissident, and former political prisoner in 1984-1987, 1997–1998, 2000–2004.

Andrey Derevyankin was born on 10 July 1959, in Krasnorechensk settlement of the Air Force base situated at Kamchatka peninsula. His father was an Air Force officer. His mother was a teacher.

Andrey Derevyankin political activity is determined by his Orthodox Christian faith as well as the values of Western liberalism.

Andrey Derevyankin participated in the anti-Soviet dissident movement since 1979. 
In 1980 he was expelled from Saratov State Academy of Law for the activities to create an anti-Soviet group of students. According to the criminal case, "in 1979-1980 while studying at the Academy he admitted the anti-Soviet talks, writing and putting up in Saratov and Tula leaflets calling to engage in an illegal organization "Justice", "showing how to make conspiracy, outlining the need to establish connections with foreigners for the carriage of anti-Soviet literature at the USSR , "suggested the use of experience of the Polish "Solidarity ". Totally he distributed over 200 leaflets".

In 1983 Andrey Derevyankin after the serving in  Soviet Army was restored at the Academy of Law  and graduated with honour in 1984.

In October 1984 Andrey Derevyankin was arrested by the KGB in Tula city in an attempt to create an independent trade union. He was charged under article 70 part 1 of the Criminal Code (anti-Soviet agitation and propaganda).

In March 1987 Andrey Derevyankin was released.

After his release  Andrey Derevyankin went on opposition activity. In May 1988 he took part in the creation of the first opposition party in the Soviet Union - the Democratic Union (DS), participated in the DS' first and second congresses, was elected to its central board. 
At the same time Andrey Derevyankin worked as a member of the central board of the National Alliance of Russian Solidarists (NTS), the oldest  anti-communist organization of Russia.

In September 1993 Andrey Derevyankin left the NTS, because of disagreement with the NTS pro-government course and took part in the defence of Russian Parliament, so called "The White House".

Then he worked as a lawyer in several Moscow commercial banks.

In September 1997 Andrey Derevyankin was arrested by the Federal Security Service of Russia (FSB) and placed in the Moscow prison "Matrosskya Tishina". In this prison Andrey Derevyankin withstood a hunger strike lasting 25 days, including a 10 days hunger strike without water. Because the intervention of international human rights organizations (Helsinki Citizen Assembly, etc.) he was released in March 1998.

On May 6, 2000, Andrey Derevyankin was arrested by the FSB in Saratov city. 
One of the main points of the charges was the creation of the Movement "Ave Maria" website on Internet, which materials were characterized by the court  as a call for an armed overthrow of the Vladimir Putin's government and a preparation for creation of illegal armed groups (articles 280 and 208 of the Russian Criminal Code). The jury recognized Andrey Derevyankin "guilty and not deserving of leniency." On December 8, 2000, Saratov regional court sentenced him to four years in prison.

All four years of the imprisonment Andrey Derevyankin spent in solitary confinement.

In 2004 Andrey Derevyankin was released. He went on opposition political activity.

In 2010 he headed the International Committee Katyn 2 to investigate independently the accident with Poland leadership in the plane crash near Smolensk.

According to his political beliefs, Andrey Derevyankin is a Christian Democrat, Westerner, and anti-communist.

References

Sources
 "58-10.The supervisory proceedings of the USSR Procuracy in cases of anti-Soviet agitation and propaganda. Annotated catalog. March 1953 - 1991." Edited by V.A. Kozlov and S.V. Mironenko. Compiled by O. Edelman, with the participation E.Y. Zavadskaya and O. Lavinsky. - M.: Democracy, 1999 (Russian)

External links
 Blog of Andrey Derevyankin at LiveJournal (Russian)
  Russian dissident seeks asylum in Georgia (English)
 Head of the Committee "Katyn-2" has asked political asylum in Sakartvelo (English)
 "Eternal revolutionary" from Russia asks for political asylum in Georgia (English)
 Time, May 25, 1998, Andrew Meier, Moscow, "One Day in the Life Of...." Solzhenitsyn caught the horror of the Soviet GULAG, but today's seething, disease-ridden Russian prisons are no better (English)
 Article "The eternal revolutionary is sentenced for 4 years imprisonment" (Russian)
 Page of Andrey Derevyankin publications at the Moscow newspaper "Free Speech" (Russian)
 The verdict of the jury in the case of Andrew Derevyankin (2000) (Russian)
 Byography data of Andrey Derevyankin (Russian)
  Interview with Andrew Derevyankin of news agency SarBK (2011) (Russian)

1959 births
Living people
Hunger strikers
People from Kamchatka Krai
Russian politicians
Soviet dissidents